is a public junior college in Akishima, Tokyo, Japan.

History 
 The Junior College was set up in 1954 at Koto, Tokyo.
 1969 new Campus was set up at Akishima, Tokyo.
 1996 the Junior College was combined with Tokyo Metropolitan Tachikawa Junior College.

Names of Academic department 
 Commerce
 Daytime course
 Evening course
 Economics

Advanced course 
 No

See also 
 Tokyo Metropolitan University
 Tokyo Metropolitan Tachikawa Junior College

External links

References

Japanese junior colleges
Universities and colleges in Tokyo
Educational institutions established in 1954
Private universities and colleges in Japan
1954 establishments in Japan